Champalakadu is a 1982 Indian Malayalam film, directed by K. G. Rajasekharan. The film stars Prem Nazir, Balan K. Nair, Mammootty, Ratheesh and Swapna in the lead roles. The film has musical score by M. K. Arjunan.

Cast
Prem Nazir
Balan K. Nair
K. P. Ummer
Mammootty
Ratheesh
Swapna
Jayamalini

Soundtrack
The music was composed by M. K. Arjunan and the lyrics were written by Kollam Gopi.

References

External links
 

1982 films
1980s Malayalam-language films
Films directed by K. G. Rajasekharan